Srem is a village in the municipality of Topolovgrad, in Haskovo Province, in southern Bulgaria. It was known as "Esenli" (Esenlü and Alabayır at 16th-century Ottoman records) during Ottoman rule.

References

Villages in Haskovo Province